Freddie Hill may refer to:

 Fred Hill (footballer, born 1940), English footballer
 Freddie Hill (footballer, born 1914) (1914–?), Welsh footballer